Nukna, or Komutu, is one of the Finisterre languages of Papua New Guinea.

References

External links
 Nukna Grammar Sketch

Finisterre languages
Languages of Morobe Province